Iddah Asin is a lawyer and corporate executive in Kenya. She is the Director of Government Affairs and Policy, for the pharmaceutical company Johnson & Johnson in the countries of the African Great Lakes. In 2017 she was named among the "Top 40 Women Under 40 in Kenya", by the Nation Media Group.

Background and education
She was born in Kenya circa 1983. She attended Kenya schools for her elementary and high school studies. In 2003 she was admitted to Makerere University, in Kampala, Uganda, the largest and oldest public university in the country. In 2007, she graduated with a Bachelor of Laws. She returned to Kenya and obtained a Diploma in Law from the Kenya School of Law, and was admitted to the Kenya Bar in 2008. Later in 2016, she graduated with a Master of Arts in Public Policy and Management, from Strathmore Business School, in Nairobi. She also holds a Certificate in Global Leadership, awarded by the New York University, Robert F. Wagner Graduate School of Public Service.

Career
For a period of nearly two years, from January 2008 until September 2009, she worked as a legal assistant in the law firm of Rautta & Company Advocates. In October 2009, she joined JetLink Express Limited , as the airline's legal counsel, based in Nairobi. She worked there for nearly four and one half years until December 2013. In January 2014, she was hired by Kenya Airways , the county's national airline, as the Manager, Government and Industry Affairs. In this role she negotiated bilateral service agreements that enabled KQ to open new routes to South Africa, Zimbabwe and Vietnam.

After three years at KQ, in February 2017, she was hired by the American pharmaceutical conglomerate Johnson & Johnson, as the director for Government Affairs and Policy in the countries of the East African Community and Ethiopia, a total of seven countries. She is based in Nairobi, Kenya.

See also
 Sauda Rajab
 Teodosia Osir
 Sylvia Mulinge
 Stellah Wairimu Bosire-Otieno

References

External links
Website of Johnson & Johnson

1983 births
Living people
Kenyan business executives
Makerere University alumni
Kenya School of Law alumni
21st-century Kenyan lawyers
Kenyan women lawyers
21st-century Kenyan businesswomen
21st-century Kenyan businesspeople
Robert F. Wagner Graduate School of Public Service alumni
Kenyan women business executives